The 1921 Springfield Red and White football team was an American football team that represented Springfield College as an independent during the 1921 college football season. Led by Elmer Berry in his fifth and final season as head coach, Springfield compiled a record of 4–5–2. Len Watters was the team's captain. Springfield played their home games at Pratt Field in Springfield, Massachusetts.

Schedule

References

Springfield
Springfield Pride football seasons
Springfield Red and White football